French Cookin' may refer to:

 French Cookin' (Stephanie Nakasian album)
 ''French Cookin''' (Budd Johnson album)

See also 
 French cooking